The Rural Municipality of Enterprise No. 142 is a rural municipality (RM) in the Canadian province of Saskatchewan within Census Division No. 8 and  Division No. 3. It is located in the southwest portion of the province.

History 
The RM of Enterprise No. 142 incorporated as a rural municipality on April 18, 1913.

Geography

Communities and localities 
The following urban municipalities are surrounded by the RM.

Villages
Richmound

The following unincorporated communities are within the RM.

Localities
Horsham
Surprise
Tunstall

Demographics 

Government 
The RM of Enterprise No. 142 is governed by an elected municipal council and an appointed administrator that meets on the second Tuesday of every month. The reeve of the RM is Wayne Freitag while its administrator is Rolande Davis. The RM's office is located in Richmound.

References 

E

Division No. 8, Saskatchewan